The Pepsi Grand Slam of Tennis was a men's tennis tournament played as part of the Grand Prix circuit from 1976–1981.  The tournament was played in Myrtle Beach, South Carolina in 1976 and Boca Raton, Florida from 1977–1981.  It was held on outdoor clay courts and featured a field of four players, winners of semi-finals played in the final, losers a consolation match. 

The tournament's official name was the "Pepsi-Cola Grand Slam of Tennis," and was sponsored by Pepsi-Cola who also sponsored a "mobile tennis program" (youth instruction) and a worldwide junior tournament circuit. CBS Sports broadcast the matches as part of its tennis coverage.

Results

Singles champions

See also
 Grand Slam Cup

References

External links
 ATP results archive
 ITF search

Clay court tennis tournaments
Grand Prix tennis circuit
Defunct tennis tournaments in the United States
Recurring sporting events established in 1976
Recurring sporting events disestablished in 1981
1976 establishments in South Carolina
1981 disestablishments in Florida